Gordon Chiarot (born c. 1937) was a Canadian football player who played for the Hamilton Tiger-Cats and BC Lions. He won the Grey Cup with Hamilton in 1957. He previous played football at and attended McMaster University.

References

1930s births
Hamilton Tiger-Cats players
Living people